Stewart's Shops is an American chain of convenience stores located primarily in eastern Upstate New York and southwestern Vermont, owned by the Dake family and the employees through an ESOP plan.

Headquartered in Ballston Spa (with a Saratoga Springs address), the company is well-established, particularly in the Capital District, Adirondacks and North Country. Within New York, its footprint stretches as far north as the Canada–US border, as far west as Oswego and as far south as Goshen at the northern fringe of the New York metropolitan area. Its Vermont outlets can be found in Rutland and Bennington counties.

Known for branded ice cream, potato chips, hard rolls, root beer, milk, coffee and other drinks, three-fourths of their stores also sell gasoline—either their own brand or in partnership with Sunoco. In addition, most also feature a small dining area. 

There are now 350+ shops in operation.

History

Preformation (1917-1945)
Stewart's traces its origins to Percy and Charles V. Dake taking over the family dairy farm in Middle Grove in 1917.  They began making Dake's Delicious Ice Cream beginning in 1921.

Fourteen years later, the brothers started Saratoga Dairy in an old barn in Saratoga Springs. This move occurred in the same year that New York began requiring all milk to be pasteurized.

In 1938 they expanded into the city's old water works, and then went into making cheese, powdered whey and casein two years afterward, following another new property purchase, this time in Greenfield. That and the milk this plant produced were sold all over the Northeast, as far south as Maryland.

Establishment (1945-1959, The first generation of Dakes)
As the war ended in 1945, the brothers bought an ice cream production facility in Ballston Spa from Donald Stewart. Charles S. "Charlie" Dake, Charles V.'s son, newly discharged from the military and looking for something to do, decided to start selling Stewart's Ice Cream to the public fresh off the line in the factory store front. This is considered to be the first Stewart's Shop.

Two others quickly followed, in Saratoga Springs and South Glens Falls. They were popular since ice cream and other sweet foods had been tightly rationed during the war. In 1948 the company introduced the folding paper ice cream carton so customers could bring home fresh ice cream more cheaply. The more notable innovation of the year, however, came from Charlie Dake's wife Phyllis "Philly" Dake, who suggested allowing people to make their own sundaes from a choice of toppings, a practice which continues today and has been widely imitated. The company's Philly Vanilla ice cream was named in her honor.

Saratoga Dairy and Stewart's Ice Cream were formally incorporated with the state in 1950, and ice cream production was moved back to the Greenfield facility, which could handle the increased demand. By 1955 there were over 50 Stewart's Shops.

1957 saw a regulatory battle between the companies and the U.S. Department of Agriculture for the right to sell the company's own milk in its own stores. It was resolved in Stewart's favor, and as a result of this vertical integration, retail milk prices in the stores dropped by 25%.

Expansion (1959-2003, The second generation of Dakes)
The younger Dake took over the company from his uncle in 1959 and the following year brought his brother, William "Bill" Dake in. The holder of a graduate degree in engineering from Cornell University, William was able to solve some production problems at the dairy, and as a result it began running at a profit. Over the course of the 1960s, the new Dake brothers turned the company into one of the East's largest private dairies.

Charlie Dake died of cancer in 1978, leaving Bill to carry on the business.  In 1984, Bill's son, Gary, joined the company, and Bill began grooming him to take over. A decade later, the company built a new dairy facility and bought the Bonfare chain, adding 40 stores at a single stroke. In the late 1990s, it began aggressively expanding out of its base in the Capital District, pushing south into the mid-Hudson Valley for the first time.

Current (2003-, The third generation of Dakes)
In 2003 Gary became president of the company, while his father became chairman. Gary is the third generation of Dakes to helm the company.

The company has long believed in employee ownership; nearly 40% of its stock is held by employees, through the Employee Stock Ownership Plan (ESOP), known as "Profit Sharing." Any employees who work more than 1,000 hours a year become eligible for this kind of stock. For 2017, the company is said to have contributed $11 million to it.

References

External links 
Stewart's Shops

Saratoga Springs, New York
Capital District (New York)
Companies based in Saratoga County, New York
Economy of New York (state)
Economy of Vermont
Convenience stores of the United States
Retail companies established in 1945